Herbert Irving Gross (April 2, 1929 – May 27, 2020) was an American Professor of mathematics (retired) and former senior lecturer at MIT’s Center for Advanced Engineering Study (CAES). He was best known as a pioneer in using distance learning for teaching mathematics.

Biography 
Gross was born in Boston MA in 1929. He studied mathematics at Brandeis University and graduated in 1953 with a B.A. in mathematics. He then attended the Massachusetts Institute of Technology as a Ph. D. candidate and a Teaching Assistant in mathematics.  In 1958, prior to having completed his studies at MIT, he left to become the founding mathematics department chairperson at Corning (NY) Community College where he remained for the next ten years. During that time he became Corning’s first educational television instructor, teaching calculus to high school students in Corning’s three high schools and published his first textbook (Mathematics: A Chronicle of Human Endeavor). He left Corning in 1968 to become the Senior Lecturer at MIT's Center for Advanced Engineering Study (CAES) where, from 1968 to 1973, he produced the critically acclaimed video course “Calculus Revisited”. In 1985 he produced Classic Arithmetic Course which was videotaped and since attracted many views and is considered to be a classic. In 2011 MIT's OpenCourseWare made the course available on its website where it has become a “cult classic” because of its “archaic” black-and-white- talking-head format.  It has received over a million views on YouTube. In 1973 he left MIT to become the founding Mathematics Department Chairperson at Bunker Hill (Boston MA) Community College, where he remained until his retirement in 2003.  While there he developed video courses in arithmetic and algebra and his work in those areas is available, free of charge for anyone to use, at http://www.mathasasecondlanguage.org. He also has another Website http://www.adjectivenounmath.com/ which contain his Classic Arithmetic Course, Algebra Course And Calculus Revisited Series. After his retirement in 2003, he continued to develop his websites while working with elementary school teachers in an attempt to help them help their students internalize mathematics better.

1974 Gross was the founding president of the American Mathematics Association of Two Year Colleges (AMATYC).

In 2014, at age 85 and under the sponsorship of Corning Inc., Gross developed a series of 40 arithmetic videos, designed to help elementary school teachers.

Social engagement 
Gross chose to leave MIT to be able to move into the community college and prison environment. Gross: "In terms of a way of life there was something special to me about using my method of teaching math to help mathematically at-risk adults learn to overcome their fear of math and thus increases their chances for greater upward mobility."  Gross often referred to the community colleges as “the statue of liberty for those who otherwise might have been educationally disenfranchised”. Gross was lauded by the principal of the Vocational School at the Harnett Correctional Institution for his work with the prisoners and his successful “Gateways to Mathematics” course (which was subtitled “Confidence through Competence”), turning even hard-core inmates around.

Awards and honors 
In 2014, Gross' work was recognized by the State University of New York (SUNY), who bestowed upon him the award of Doctor of Humane Letters.

Video recordings

MIT Calculus Revisited 
 Calculus Revisited (Single Variable Calculus): https://www.youtube.com/playlist?list=PL3B08AE665AB9002A
 Calculus Revisited (Multivariable Calculus): https://www.youtube.com/playlist?list=PL1C22D4DED943EF7B
 Calculus Revisited (Calculus of Complex Variables): https://www.youtube.com/playlist?list=PLD971E94905A70448

Classic Arithmetic  
 On His Website :   http://www.adjectivenounmath.com/id75.html
 YouTube Playlist : https://www.youtube.com/playlist?list=PL9phnVI_EOVW9U2PZtGKRwMvHy3l4reYv

Mathematics As A Second Language 
https://www.youtube.com/playlist?list=PLufObkSlzUUU4oKivkiwchXBRfAzQXpcu

AMATYC 
 2014 AMATYC Conference: https://www.youtube.com/watch?v=VMsm31PxHoI

Publications 
 “Mathematics: A Chronicle of Human Endeavor” (1971, Holt, Rinehart and Winston)
 “Algebra By Example” (1978, D. C. Heath)
 “Gateways to Mathematics” (1983, Control Systems Engineering)

References

External links 
 https://www.corning-cc.edu/news/former-ccc-professor-receives-suny-honorary-degree at corning-cc.edu
 http://www.adjectivenounmath.com/id102.html
 http://lovemath.org/id5.html

2020 deaths
1929 births
20th-century American mathematicians
21st-century American mathematicians
Brandeis University alumni
Massachusetts Institute of Technology alumni
Mathematicians from Massachusetts
People from Boston